"Only Love" is a song recorded by Jamaican-American reggae artist Shaggy and American artists, rapper Pitbull and R&B singer Gene Noble. It was released on 15 August 2015 through RED Associated Labels, a division of Sony Music Entertainment.

Background 
The song is described as a 'high-energy dance single' with Shaggy and Pitbull providing uplifting flow verses and Gene Noble providing the chorus. The concept of the song is to 'show how powerful love is'. Shaggy said he was inspired to write the song that brings happiness to people.

Music video 
On 22 January 2016, Shaggy released the official music video for the song. The video version does not feature Pitbull in both the song and the music video. The music video was directed by Parris. It features Shaggy and Gene Noble performing on an open grassland.

Track listing

Charts

References 

2015 songs
2015 singles
Songs written by Costi Ioniță
Shaggy (musician) songs
Pitbull (rapper) songs